Xavier Lamar Dotson (born January 12, 1980), known professionally as Zaytoven, is an American record producer from Atlanta, Georgia. He has released collaborative projects with artists including Gucci Mane, Usher, Future, Young Dolph, Migos, Lecrae, Lil Yachty, Chief Keef, Young Scooter, B.o.B, Boosie Badazz, Waka Flocka Flame, Jack Harlow, and Deitrick Haddon.

Zaytoven signed a deal with rapper Gucci Mane to become 1017 Brick Squad's in-house producer and then went on to win a Grammy Award in 2011 for his contribution to Usher's album Raymond v. Raymond, as a co-producer and writer for the single "Papers" along with Sean Garrett.

Early life
Dotson spent a lot of time at church growing up, as his father was a preacher when not working for the army. He learned to play instruments through the church bands along with his three younger siblings. He gravitated toward playing the piano and organ.

Dotson was introduced to rap in middle school by a friend. He learned to produce music while attending high school in his spare time between school and basketball, Dotson played the keyboard during halftime at his high school football games. While he was performing one day at the game, rapper JT the Bigga Figga liked what he heard, and invited Dotson to his studio, where Dotson had unlimited access to his keyboards. He truly began to utilize his skills as a producer while making beats in JT's studio before he started making a name for himself in Atlanta.

Career

Career beginnings
Zaytoven started going over to JT the Bigga Figga's studio every day to make beats and learn how to use the equipment. He began to sell beats to JT and went on to collaborate with Bay Area artists such as Messy Marv and E-40 while still in high school. During his senior year in high school, Zaytoven's family moved to Atlanta, Georgia, due to his father's retirement. Zaytoven decided to stay in San Francisco, California, finish his senior year, and continue his producing for local rappers. He realized that he needed a studio of his own where he could produce with his own equipment and work at any time of the day.

Having saved up money from his day job as a barber, Zaytoven began to buy equipment for producing. He would ship this to his parents' house in Atlanta, to which he eventually moved, and set up his own studio there. He enrolled in a local barber college in Atlanta and got a job as a barber to help finance the rest of his studio. While attending barber school, a classmate of his introduced Zaytoven to Gucci Mane, who would become his right-hand man in his career as a producer. Zaytoven and Gucci Mane began to work together every day after meeting each other. Zaytoven said in an interview with Fader that Gucci Mane would call him at 7 a.m. asking if he was ready to start making music for that day. Zaytoven and Gucci Mane spent the majority of the early 2000s making music together and selling mixtapes out of the trunks of their cars in Atlanta. It wasn't until 2005 that the two gained mainstream recognition from their hit song "Icy", with features from Young Jeezy and Boo. This recognition gave Zaytoven's career the boost it needed to take off, landing the hit song "Papers" with Usher in 2010 on Usher's certified platinum album Raymond v. Raymond.

Rise to fame
Zaytoven's work on Usher's album Raymond v. Raymond earned him a Grammy Award in 2011 and a serious reputation in the hip-hop world. He started to work with more artists as his popularity grew in the Atlanta rap scene. He helped shaped the careers of artists such as OJ da Juiceman, Yung L.A., Yung Ralph, Shop Boyz, Lil Scrappy, Jagged Edge, and Gorilla Zoe.

Zaytoven collaborated with hip hop trio Migos. He produced several tracks on their 2013 mixtape, Y.R.N. (Young Rich Niggas), including the hit track "Versace", which peaked at 53 on the Billboard chart. Zaytoven's collaboration with Migos continued; he helped produce their followup mixtape No Label 2, released on February 25, 2014.

In 2015, Zaytoven provided exclusive production for ten mixtapes, including Future's Beast Mode, released on January 15. He also worked on Future's album DS2, which debuted on July 17.

In July 2016, Zaytoven produced or co-produced seven songs on Gucci Mane's first album since being released from prison, Everybody Looking. In the same month, Lil Uzi Vert's The Perfect LUV Tape was released, containing the Zaytoven-produced songs "Money Mitch" and "SideLine Watching (Hold Up)". In 2017, Zaytoven contributed to projects such as Gucci Mane's Mr. Davis, 21 Savage's Issa Album, Migos' Culture, Moneybagg Yo's Heartless, and Yo Gotti's I Still Am. Zaytoven also released two independent projects, Wake Up & Cook Up and Where Would the Game Be Without Me.

Zaytoven was scheduled to release his debut album Trap Holizay on May 25, 2018, and a collaborative album with Lecrae titled Let the Trap Say Amen on June 22, 2018.

Acting career
Zaytoven made his acting debut in the 2012 film Birds of a Feather, co-starring with Gucci Mane. The sequel Birds of a Feather 2 was released in 2018.

Tracklib 
In 2018, Zaytoven joined the Creators Advisory Board of Tracklib.

Discography

Collaborative albums

Compilation albums

Extended plays

Mixtapes

Other charted songs

Production discography

Charted songs 

Notes

Filmography

References

External links
 

1980 births
Living people
1017 Brick Squad artists
German record producers
German hip hop DJs
Musicians from Frankfurt
Hardcore hip hop artists
Trap musicians
Performers of Christian hip hop music